In algebra, a divided domain is an integral domain R in which every prime ideal  satisfies .  A locally divided domain is an integral domain that is a divided domain at every maximal ideal.  A Prüfer domain is a basic example of a locally divided domain. Divided domains were introduced by  who called them AV-domains.

References

External links 
https://web.archive.org/web/20120114162738/http://www.latp.cahen.u-3mrs.fr/Recherche/Pubs/locdiv.pdf

Commutative algebra